The Thessaloniki Forum (Greek: Φόρουμ Θεσσαλονίκης) was an indoor sports arena that was located near the center of the city of Thessaloniki, in Greece. The venue was used to host basketball games, handball games, ice hockey games, and athletics competitions.

History
The Thessaloniki Forum's attendance record was 42,000 people, which was set in 1929. The Forum was at one time used as the home venue of the Greek basketball clubs PAOK Thessaloniki, Aris Thessaloniki, Iraklis Thessaloniki, and HANTH. The ice hockey club Penguins Salonica, also used the venue to host games.

In 1972, The Forum was used by 10 different sports clubs. It was used by four basketball clubs, two athletics clubs, two ice hockey clubs, and two handball clubs that year. 

Basketball venues in Greece
Defunct basketball venues in Greece
Defunct indoor arenas in Greece
Defunct sports venues in Greece
Handball venues in Greece
Indoor ice hockey venues in Greece